Rick Hayes is an American politician currently serving as a Connecticut State Representative from the 51st District, which encompasses the towns of Putnam, Thompson, and parts of Killingly. A member of the Republican Party, Hayes first ran for the seat in 2018 in an election where he would win over Democratic candidate Larry Groh Jr. Hayes was re-elected in 2020, once again defeating Groh. Hayes currently serves as a member of the House General Law Committee, the Environment Committee, and the Public Safety and Security Committee. He is also a member of the Putnam Board of Selectman, serving in that position since 2017.

References

21st-century American politicians
Republican Party members of the Connecticut House of Representatives
Living people
1959 births